Anisonychidae is a family of tardigrades belonging to the order Arthrotardigrada.

Genera:
 Anisonyches Pollock, 1975

References

Heterotardigrada
Tardigrade families